Deep Down is an album by the American blues musician Carey Bell, recorded in Chicago in 1995 and released by the Alligator label.

Reception

AllMusic reviewer Bill Dahl stated: "More than a quarter century after he cut his debut album, Bell recently made his finest disc to date. Boasting superior material and musicianship and a goosed-up energy level that frequently reaches incendiary heights, the disc captures Bell outdoing himself". The Penguin Guide to Blues Recordings stated that "Bell benefits greatly from a high-quality backing band and a tight production team that curbs his habitual excesses ...It tends to suggest Bell might inherit the Chicago harmonica crown on merit rather than by default".

Track listing
All compositions by Carey Bell except where noted
 "I Got to Go" (Little Walter) − 3:56
 "Let Me Stir in Your Pot" − 3:42
 "When I Get Drunk" (Eddie "Guitar" Burns) − 5:16
 "Low Down Dirty Shame" − 4:29
 "Borrow Your Love" − 3:59
 "Lonesome Stranger" − 4:03
 "After You" (Sonny Boy Williamson II) − 3:41
 "I Got a Rich Man's Woman" (L. J. Welch) − 4:43
 "Jawbreaker" − 2:57
 "Must I Holler" − 7:00
 "Tired of Giving You My Love" − 3:49
 "Easy" (Big Walter Horton) − 4:44

Personnel
Carey Bell − harmonica, vocals
Lucky Peterson − piano
Carl Weathersby, Lurrie Bell − guitar
Johnny Gayden − bass
Ray "Killer" Allison – drums

References

Alligator Records albums
1995 albums
Carey Bell albums